General Harrison may refer to:

United Kingdom
Desmond Harrison (1896–1984), British Army major general
Eric Harrison (British Army officer) (1893–1987), British Army major general
Ian Harrison (Royal Marines officer) (1919–2008), Royal Marines major general
James Harrison (British Army officer) (1880–1957), British Army major general
Thomas Harrison (soldier) (1616–1660), general on the side of Parliament in the English Civil War

United States
Benjamin Harrison (1833–1901), brevet brigadier general of volunteers and later President of the United States
Benjamin Harrison (major general) (born 1928), U.S. Army major general
Charles Harrison (general) (1740–1793), Continental Army brevet brigadier general
George Paul Harrison Sr. (1813–1888), Georgia Militia brigadier general in the American Civil War
James E. Harrison (1815–1875), Confederate States Army brigadier general 
Thomas Harrison (general) (1823–1891), Confederate States Army brigadier general 
William Henry Harrison (businessman) (1892–1956), U.S. Army major general
William H. Harrison (USMC) (1896–1955), U.S. Marine Corps brigadier general
William Hardin Harrison (born 1933), U.S. Army lieutenant general
William Henry Harrison (1773–1841), U.S. Army major general and later President of the United States
William Kelly Harrison Jr. (1895–1987), U.S. Army lieutenant general

Other
James Harrison (Australian governor) (1912–1971), Australian Army major general

See also
Attorney General Harrison (disambiguation)